HIR is a medical image and medical record app developed by Columbus, Ohio-based technology company Olah Healthcare. The app allows people to consolidate and manage their medical history regardless of which computer system a hospital or practice uses.  People can manage their medical records on the platform they want: their smartphone. The app has over 90% patient engagement and download rate since its soft-launch in October, 2015.

History 
HIR emerged from an observation the founder, Brian Olah made while building a Historian solution for an OB/Gyn practice.  In June 2015, Brian observed a patient taking a picture of a fetal ultrasound image in a waiting area. "Hmm, We have that picture and can get it to her faster than she can take it", he thought. It was that moment when HIR was born.

Starting in October 2015, the HIR app has been a wonderful experience for patients and the practices that have enrolled. In a landscape of mobile apps where patient engagement rate is below 10%, HIR has proven that pictures are worth a thousand words by engaging with patients at over a 90% rate.

In February 2016, HIR expanded to include sharing of any medical record from physicians to patient - without any charge, installation or subscription necessary by the physician or patient. HIR allows patients to manage all their medical content and communicate with their providers from one app.

Mobile App 
HIR is a mobile application that consolidates people’s medical images and records from multiple providers clinical systems all in one smartphone app. HIR allows people to receive medical images, take their own pictures, and share with providers via healthcare industry accepted Direct Messaging protocol.

Physicians 

Physician practices use HIR to securely communicate with their patients with their existing EMR solution. Practices use HIR to share a wide range of images with their patients. HIR provides physicians with the tools to provide as little or as much information to the patient. From individual fetal ultrasound images to complete cardiac echo videos and everything in between. Clinicians control which images are sent to the patient via HIR.

Patients 

HIR is a patient-centric healthcare app for all their healthcare information. HIR allows patients to store information securely and communicate with clinicians using the same secure messaging technology that physicians communicate with each other. Patients can receive medical records and images. Patients can share medical records with any physician.

See also 
 Olah Healthcare

External links 
 Olah Healthcare Website
 HIR Healthcare Website

IOS software
Android (operating system) software
Mobile applications